Edigu (or Edigey) (also İdegäy or Edege Mangit) (1352–1419) was a Mongol Muslim emir of the White Horde who founded a new political entity, which came to be known as the Nogai Horde.

Edigu was from the Crimean Manghud tribe, the son of Baltychak, a Mongol noble who was defeated and killed by Khan Tokhtamysh of the Golden Horde in 1378. He gained fame as a highly successful general of Tokhtamysh before turning the arms against his master. By 1396, he was a sovereign ruler of a large area stretching between the Volga and Ural (known locally as Yayyk) rivers, which would later be called the Nogai Horde.

In 1397, Edigu allied himself with Timur-Qutlugh and was appointed General and commander-in-chief of the Golden Horde armies. In 1399 he inflicted a crushing defeat on Tokhtamysh and Vytautas of Lithuania at the Vorskla River. Thereupon he managed to unite under his rule all Jochi's lands, albeit for the last time in history.

In 1406, he located his old enemy Tokhtamysh in Siberia. Edigu's agents killed Tokhtamysh. The following year he raided Volga Bulgaria. In 1408, he staged a destructive Tatar invasion of Russia, which hadn't paid the tribute due to the horde for several decades. Edigu burnt Nizhny Novgorod, Gorodets, Rostov, and many other towns but failed to take Moscow, though he had still burnt it.

Two years later Edigu was dethroned in the Golden Horde and had to seek refuge in Khwarezm. Though he had previously had relations with the Timurid ruler Shah Rukh, including marrying his daughter to the latter's son Muhammad Juki, Shah Rukh later had Edigu expelled back to Sarai. However, Edigu managed to ravage Kiev under Lithuanian rule in spring 1416, in which he burnt the Pechersk Monastery and the old town, but was unable to capture its castle. In 1418, he offered Vytautas peace and alliance against Tokhtamysh's sons.

In 1419, he was assassinated by one of Tokhtamysh's sons in Sarai. Edigu's dynasty in the Nogai Horde continued for about two centuries, until his last descendants moved to Moscow, where they took baptism and became known as Princes Urusov and Yusupov.

The Mamluk era Historian Al-Maqrizi describes him as being Courageous, Generous and someone "who loved Islamic Scholars & sought to be close to the pious". He praises him for being a Righteous Muslim who fasted & followed the laws of Islam. al-Maqrizi also says that Edigu prohibited the Tatars from selling their sons and due to this not many of them were bought to the Mamluk territories of Egypt and Syria.

References 

1352 births
1419 deaths
Nomadic groups in Eurasia
14th-century monarchs in Europe
15th-century monarchs in Europe
15th-century murdered monarchs
Turkic mythology